Multiscale motion mapping is a method of image analysis of the heart. The analyzation relies on a combination of multiscale image analysis, motion and deformation analysis using mathematical moments, and linear algebra. It also uses 2D vectors with lengths proportional to velocity or deformation for visual velocity display.

Historically, analysis of heart imaging has been performed by "eyeballing", i.e., by subjective assessment, by measurements on still frames and M-Modes images, and later by Doppler techniques that are based on the phase shift of a reflected ultrasound signal. Such analyses are by necessity constrained to the motion velocity component parallel to the ultrasound beam, while motion perpendicular to the beam will produce no phase shift in the reflected ultrasound beam and therefore appear as "zero velocity" by such Doppler techniques. To overcome these problems, a solution was sought and discovered based on mathematical imaging by an academic consortium consisting of cardiovascular researchers at the University Hospital of Basel and mathematicians at the Ecole Polytechnique Federale in Lausanne, Switzerland.

Soon after publication of this method of analysis at international conventions and in journal articles, similar techniques based on these ideas were implemented by the medical imaging industry, e.g. by Siemens under the designation "Vector Velocity Imaging" (2006).

References

Medical imaging